Jacqueline C. Romero (born 1970/1971) is an American lawyer who serves as the United States attorney for the Eastern District of Pennsylvania.

Early life and education 

Romero is the granddaughter of Spanish immigrants. She earned a Bachelor of Arts degree from the College of New Jersey in 1993 and a Juris Doctor from Rutgers Law School in 1996.

Career 

Romero was an associate at Lowenstein Sandler from 1996 to 1998. From 1998 to 2000, she served as a trial attorney in the United States Department of Justice. From 2000 to 2006, she was senior counsel for the United States Mint. Since 2006, she has served as assistant United States attorney for the Eastern District of Pennsylvania.

United States attorney for the Eastern District of Pennsylvania 
On April 22, 2022, President Joe Biden announced his intent to nominate Romero to serve as the United States attorney for the Eastern District of Pennsylvania. On April 25, 2022, her nomination was sent to the Senate.  On June 9, 2022, her nomination was reported out of the Senate Judiciary Committee by a voice vote; senators Ted Cruz, Josh Hawley and Marsha Blackburn were recorded as "Nay". On June 13, 2022, her nomination was confirmed in the United States Senate by voice vote. She was sworn into office on June 21, 2022. She is the first woman appointed by the president and confirmed by the Senate, in addition, she is the first woman of color and first LGBTQIA+ person to become U.S. attorney for the Eastern District.

References 

1970s births
Living people
Year of birth missing (living people)
20th-century American women lawyers
20th-century American lawyers
21st-century American women lawyers
21st-century American lawyers
American people of Spanish descent
Assistant United States Attorneys
The College of New Jersey alumni
LGBT lawyers
Pennsylvania lawyers
Rutgers Law School alumni
United States Attorneys for the Eastern District of Pennsylvania